Frederich Cepeda Cruz (born April 8, 1980) is a Cuban professional baseball outfielder for who is currently a free agent. He also played in Nippon Professional Baseball for the Yomiuri Giants.

Career
Cepeda signed with the Yomiuri Giants of Nippon Professional Baseball on April 19, 2014. In parts of 2 seasons with Yomiuri, Cepeda slashed .163/.319/.326 with 6 home runs and 19 RBI.On August 13, 2018, Cepeda signed with the Toros de Tijuana of the Mexican League. Cepeda did not play in a game in 2020 due to the cancellation of the Mexican League season because of the COVID-19 pandemic. On February 12, 2021, Cepeda was traded to El Águila de Veracruz of the Mexican League, a new expansion team. However, the contract was later voided due to monetary concerns and Cepeda became a free agent.

International career
Cepeda previously played for the Cuban national baseball team and Sancti Spíritus of the Cuban National Series. Cepeda was part of the Cuban team that won the gold medal at the 2004 Summer Olympics and second place at the 2006 World Baseball Classic and 2008 Summer Olympics. He was selected as part of the All Stars at the 2009 World Baseball Classic  where he had a .500 batting average with 3 homers in 6 games and 24 at-bats.

Cepeda won with his national team, the gold medal of the 2014 Central American and Caribbean Games in Veracruz, Mexico.

References

External links
 

1980 births
Living people
Baseball players at the 2003 Pan American Games
Baseball players at the 2004 Summer Olympics
Baseball players at the 2007 Pan American Games
Baseball players at the 2008 Summer Olympics
Baseball players at the 2011 Pan American Games
Baseball players at the 2015 Pan American Games
Cazadores de Artemisa players
Central American and Caribbean Games gold medalists for Cuba
Competitors at the 2006 Central American and Caribbean Games
Competitors at the 2014 Central American and Caribbean Games
Cuban expatriate baseball players in Japan
Gallos de Sancti Spiritus players
Medalists at the 2008 Summer Olympics
Medalists at the 2004 Summer Olympics
Nippon Professional Baseball left fielders
Olympic baseball players of Cuba
Olympic gold medalists for Cuba
Olympic medalists in baseball
Olympic silver medalists for Cuba
Pan American Games bronze medalists for Cuba
Pan American Games gold medalists for Cuba
Pan American Games medalists in baseball
People from Sancti Spíritus
Toros de Tijuana players
Yomiuri Giants players
2006 World Baseball Classic players
2009 World Baseball Classic players
2013 World Baseball Classic players
2017 World Baseball Classic players
Central American and Caribbean Games medalists in baseball
Medalists at the 2003 Pan American Games
Medalists at the 2007 Pan American Games
Medalists at the 2015 Pan American Games
Medalists at the 2011 Pan American Games
Industriales de La Habana players
Cuban expatriate baseball players in Mexico